Marta Frogg (also Martha Frogg, née Martha Rynning Olsen, March 18, 1871 – April 2, 1950) was a Norwegian actress, singer, and prompter.

Family
Marta Frogg was born in Austre Moland, the daughter of the master mason Olaus Olsen (1828–1914) and Inger Marie Rynning Kristensen (1827–1897), and the sister of the actress Ragna Wettergreen (1864–1958). On November 25, 1891, she married the lawyer Nicolai Frogg (1866–?) in Kristiania (now Oslo). She was the mother of the actor Odd Frogg (1901–1934). In contemporary times, the family name was often written Frog.

Life and work
Marta Frogg debuted on November 1, 1907 at the Fahlstrøm Theater in the role of Annette in Maternité (Norwegian title: Ugifte Mødre) by Eugène Brieux. Her sister Ragna Wettergreen played the role of Lucie in the same production. She took part in a theater tour in 1910 and 1911. In addition to appearing in plays, she performed in shows and sang. In the 1927–1928 season, she was a prompter at Agnes Mowinckel's Balkongen theater.

Selected roles
Annette in Maternité (Norwegian title: Ugifte Mødre) by Eugène Brieux (Fahlstrøm Theater, 1907)
Florizel in Et Besøg (Norwegian title: Et Besøk) by Edvard Brandes (Randsfjord Theater, 1910)

References

External links
 Marta Frogg at Sceneweb

1871 births
1950 deaths
20th-century Norwegian actresses
20th-century Norwegian women singers
20th-century Norwegian singers
People from Arendal